Abracris flavolineata is a species of short-horned grasshopper in the family Acrididae, found in southern North America, Central America, and South America.

References

External links

 

Acrididae
Fauna of Suriname